Philippe Donnet (born 26 July 1960 in Suresnes, France) is a French business executive and CEO of the Italian company Assicurazioni Generali since March 2016.

Education 
Donnet graduated in 1983 from École Polytechnique and in 1991 from the Institute of Actuaries of France.

Career

Early career 
In 1983, Donnet began his executive career at Maisons Phoenix, a French contractor. He held different positions within the insurance sector until 1997 when he was appointed Deputy Managing Director of AXA Conseil.

In 1999, Donnet was appointed CEO of AXA Assicurazioni, a position he held for two years. In 2001 he was appointed Regional CEO responsible for the Mediterranean region, Middle East, Latin America and Canada.

In 2002, Donnet was assigned the role of chairman and CEO of AXA Re as well as Chairman of AXA Corporate Solutions. Two years later  Donnet was appointed CEO of Axa Japan  and in 2006 he took on the role of CEO for the Asia-Pacific region.

In 2007, he left the insurance sector for a period of six years to take on the position of Director for the Asia-Pacific region at Wendel Investissement, Singapore. In 2010, Donnet founded HLD, an investment firm.

Career at Generali 
Donnet joined Generali in 2013 as country manager for Italy and CEO of Generali Italy. He will hold this role until 2016, leading the integration of five of Generali Group brands (Generali, Ina Assitalia, Toro, Lloyd Italico e Augusta). 

Since March 2016, Donnet has held the position of CEO of Generali Group.

Donnet chairs the Group Management Committee (GMC), the committee which defines Generali's strategic guidelines (as of April 2017). 

In 2022, Generali’s outgoing board put forward Donnet for a third mandate as CEO. Ahead of a shareholder vote, Francesco Gaetano Caltagirone and Leonardo Del Vecchio who are, respectively, Generali's second- and third-largest investors, proposed naming Luciano Cirina as its new chief executive, in a challenge to Donnet's reappointment. Donnet subsequently ended Cirina’s employment with immediate effect, citing breach of contract.

Other activities 
 Cini Foundation, Member of the General Council
 Geneva Association, Member of the Board of Directors
 Italian National Association of Insurance Companies (INAIC), Vice President (since 2016)
 MIB Trieste School of Management, President of the Board (since 2015)

Personal life 
Donnet is a former rugby player and is the proprietor of one of the major French wood barrel manufacturers.

Honours

References

French chief executives
Living people
1960 births
École Polytechnique alumni